The Port Madison-Suquamish-Poulsbo route was a shipping route that originated from Seattle, Washington.  The route included stops at Port Madison, Suquamish, and Poulsbo, Washington.  As of January 1, 1917, the Kitsap County Transportation Company was operating steamboats on the route.  The company also owned a dock at Suquamish and 2,200 feet of waterfront property at Port Madison.

Notes

References
 Public Service Commission of Washington, Complainant, v. Kitsap County Transportation Company, Respondent, Case No. 4274, published in State of Washington, Public Service Commission, Annual Report (1916), at page 150 (accessed 06-04-11)]

Steamship routes in Washington (state)
History of Kitsap County, Washington